Vicente Cavalcante Fialho (27 January 1938 – 12 July 2022) was a Brazilian engineer and politician. A member of the Liberal Front Party, he served as mayor of Fortaleza from 1971 to 1975 and served in the Chamber of Deputies from 1991 to 1995.

Fialho died of COVID-19 in Fortaleza on 12 July 2022, at the age of 84.

References

1938 births
2022 deaths
People from Tauá
Mayors of Fortaleza
Energy ministers of Brazil
Members of the Chamber of Deputies (Brazil) from Ceará
Liberal Front Party (Brazil) politicians
Federal University of Ceará alumni
Federal University of Rio de Janeiro alumni
Deaths from the COVID-19 pandemic in Ceará